Ross Field may refer to:

 Ross Field (airfield), a former military airfield in Arcadia, California, United States
 Ross Field (athletic), a former athletic field in Auburn, Alabama, United States
 Ross Field (sailor), a New Zealand sailor
 Ross Field, a parade ground at Naval Station Great Lakes in Illinois, United States
 Ross Field, portion of Southwest Michigan Regional Airport